On  4 August 2015, two passenger trains – Kamayani Express and Janata Express – derailed near Kurawan and Bhringi railway station,  southwest of Harda, Madhya Pradesh.  At least 31 people were killed and 100 people were injured.

Accident 
The Kamayani Express, which was headed to Varanasi on the down line, derailed as flash floods (caused by  Cyclonic Storm Komen) dislodged a culvert near the Machak river, causing track misalignment. The derailment resulted in some coaches becoming submerged in the river and some coaches blocking the up line. The Janata Express derailed near the same spot soon after. At least 31 people died and 100 people were injured. Several people were reported to be washed away by the river. Six coaches of the Kamayani Express and the engine plus the four coaches of the Janata Express derailed.

A train safely crossed the bridge ten minutes before the first derailment. The river level was abnormally high, and flash floods gradually washed away the trackbed, resulting in sinking of the track. The driver of the Janata Express applied the brakes but could not stop the train from derailing.

Rescue 
Rescuers searched through the night for survivors and bodies. Over 300 people were rescued. The adverse weather conditions delayed the arrival of the rescue teams. Local residents were reported to have helped initially. By the morning of 5 August, the derailed trains had been removed and the bodies of the victims had been recovered. Over 25 trains traveling from Mumbai, Punjab, Uttar Pradesh, and Madhya Pradesh were stopped or diverted, mainly into neighboring Rajasthan.

Investigation 
The Commissioner for Railway Safety in the Central Railway zone opened an inquiry into the accident.

See also 
 2015 North Indian Ocean cyclone season
 2015 Myanmar floods

References 

2015 disasters in India
Derailments in India
Harda district
Rail transport in Madhya Pradesh
Railway accidents in 2015
Railway accidents and incidents in Madhya Pradesh
August 2015 events in India
Disasters in Madhya Pradesh
History of Madhya Pradesh (1947–present)